The Fort Wayne and Jackson Railroad was a railway company in the United States. It was incorporated in 1879 to reorganize the Fort Wayne, Jackson and Saginaw Railroad, which owned a railway line between Fort Wayne, Indiana, and Jackson, Michigan. The Lake Shore and Michigan Southern Railway leased the company in 1882. Most of the company's line has been abandoned.

History 
The precursor of the Fort Wayne and Jackson Railroad was the Fort Wayne, Jackson and Saginaw Railroad, which was incorporated on January 26, 1869. That company consolidated two older companies, the Jackson, Fort Wayne and Cincinnati Railroad of Michigan and the Fort Wayne, Jackson and Saginaw Railroad of Indiana. A further  from Reading to Angola, Indiana, was completed on January 17, 1870. The final  from Angola to Fort Wayne, Indiana, was finished on December 5, 1870.

Lake Shore and Michigan Southern Railway leased the company in 1882. This lease was later assumed by the New York Central Railroad (1915) and Penn Central Transportation (1968).

Much of line was abandoned in 1973, following the Penn Central bankruptcy:

 Waterloo, Indiana–Pleasant Lake, Indiana
 Jonesville, Michigan–Bankers, Michigan
 Haires, Michigan–Horton, Michigan

These abandonments left four sections of the old line: yard trackage within Jackson, a branch from Jonesville to Horton, a branch from Bankers to Pleasant Lake, and a branch from Fort Wayne to Waterloo. In 1976, several small sections within the vicinity of Fort Wayne, Jackson, and Waterloo were conveyed to Conrail. The lines between Jonesville and Horton, and Auburn and Waterloo, saw little traffic and was abandoned. The new short-line railroad Hillsdale County Railway took over the section between Bankers and Pleasant Lake. In 1981, the city of Auburn established the City of Auburn Port Authority to purchase the remaining  that connected the city with the Baltimore and Ohio Railroad, and then leased the line to the B&O (now CSX Transportation).

Notes

References 
 
 
 
 
 
 

Defunct Indiana railroads
Defunct Michigan railroads
Railway companies established in 1879
Railway companies disestablished in 1976
Railroads transferred to Conrail
American companies established in 1879
Companies affiliated with the New York Central Railroad